Mahaveer Raghunathan (born 17 November 1998) is an Indian racing driver who last competed in the 2019 FIA Formula 2 Championship with MP Motorsport.

Career

Lower formula 
Raghunathan started his racing career in karting in 2012, where he remained active until 2013. He also made his Formula racing debut in 2012, in four races of the JK Racing Asia Series for the Meco Racing team.

In 2013, Raghunathan competed in the MRF Challenge Formula 1600, finishing sixth. He also took part in the final race weekend of the Formula Masters China series at the Shanghai International Circuit for the Cebu Pacific Air by KCMG team

In 2014, Raghunathan moved to the new Italian F4 Championship, debuting on the second race weekend for the F & M team. He finished 12th in the championship

European F3 Championship & GP3 Series 
At the beginning of 2015, Raghunathan took part in the final race weekend of the MRF Challenge Formula 2000 series at the Madras Motor Race Track. He then returned to Europe to take part in the European Formula 3 Championship for the Motopark team.He failed to get any points, finishing 39th in the championship  Raghunathan took part in the official GP3 post season test with the Campos and Trident teams, in preparation for the 2016 GP3 Series, but he only raced in the first round of the championship for Koiranen GP. He also tested with the Coloni Motorsport team in Auto GP.

Auto GP & BOSS GP Series 
In 2016, Raghunathan raced in the Auto GP championship with Italian team PS Racing, being second in the championship. In the same year, he also raced in the BOSS GP series in the Formula Class and secured two podiums in his class.

In 2017, Raghunathan continued racing in BOSS GP's Formula Class Championship with PS Racing. He made 13 podiums out of 14 races in his class, and ending the season as the champion of the Formula Class. He is the first and only Indian to win the BOSS GP Championship.

FIA Formula 2 Championship 
In 2019, Raghunathan raced in the FIA Formula 2 Championship alongside Jordan King for MP Motorsport. He was subsequently suspended for the Austrian round based on the accumulation of 12 penalty points on his license during the season. He returned to the seat for the Silverstone round, continuing to run around at the back of the field. Both Raghunathan and team-mate King were reprimanded for failing to slow for yellow flags in qualifying at Spa-Francorchamps. A reduced field at the following round in Italy led to his only point of the season, but he was once again penalised in Sochi for not following track-limit procedures. He finished the season 20th in the standings, being the last placed driver to have scored a point.

Formula One test 
	
In August 2021, nearly two years after Raghunathan's last appearance behind the wheel of a race car, the Indian tested the Alfa Romeo Racing C38 alongside Théo Pourchaire at the Hungaroring where he set a time 1.9 seconds slower than the Frenchman.

World Endurance Championship 
The following year, Raghunathan took part in the FIA World Endurance Championship rookie test at the Bahrain International Circuit, driving for Algarve Pro Racing.

Racing record

Racing career summary

Complete Italian F4 Championship results 
(key) (Races in bold indicate pole position) (Races in italics indicate fastest lap)

Complete FIA Formula 3 European Championship results
(key) (Races in bold indicate pole position) (Races in italics indicate fastest lap)

Complete Masters of Formula 3 results

Complete Auto GP Formula Open Championship results 
(key) (Races in bold indicate pole position) (Races in italics indicate fastest lap)

Complete GP3 Series results
(key) (Races in bold indicate pole position) (Races in italics indicate fastest lap)

Complete BOSS GP Series results 
(key) (Races in bold indicate pole position) (Races in italics indicate fastest lap)

Complete FIA Formula 2 Championship results 
(key) (Races in bold indicate pole position) (Races in italics indicate points for the fastest lap of top ten finishers)

References

External links
Profile at Driver Database

1998 births
Living people
Indian racing drivers
Italian F4 Championship drivers
FIA Formula 3 European Championship drivers
Indian GP3 Series drivers
FIA Formula 2 Championship drivers
MP Motorsport drivers
MRF Challenge Formula 2000 Championship drivers
Euroformula Open Championship drivers
KCMG drivers
Motopark Academy drivers
Koiranen GP drivers
United Autosports drivers
Formula Renault 2.0 Alps drivers
Formula Masters China drivers
Auto GP drivers
Cram Competition drivers
Team West-Tec drivers
Target Racing drivers
20th-century Indian people
21st-century Indian people
Le Mans Cup drivers